William Whelton (born August 28, 1959) is an American former professional ice hockey player who played two games in the National Hockey League.  He played for the Winnipeg Jets.

Career statistics

Regular season and playoffs

External links 

1959 births
Living people
American men's ice hockey defensemen
Boston University Terriers men's ice hockey players
Brunico SG players
ECH Chur players
Ice hockey players from Massachusetts
Lahti Pelicans players
Sherbrooke Jets players
Sportspeople from Everett, Massachusetts
Tulsa Oilers (1964–1984) players
Winnipeg Jets (1979–1996) draft picks
Winnipeg Jets (1979–1996) players